Ben Harrison (born 24 February 1988) is a former rugby league footballer who last played as a  and  forward for the Barrow Raiders in Betfred League 1. He has played at international level for Ireland, England and the England Knights.

He previously played for the Warrington Wolves in the Super League and on loan from Warrington at the Widnes Vikings in the Championship and the Wakefield Trinity Wildcats in the Super League.

Background
Ben Harrison was born in Barrow-in-Furness, Cumbria, England, he is the younger brother of the rugby league footballer; Liam Harrison, and he was a pupil, and played rugby union, at Chetwynde School in Barrow-in-Furness.

Playing career

Warrington Wolves
Harrison signed for the Warrington Wolves in 2005, he made his début for the Warrington side against the Salford City Reds, and other than two loan periods, he played his entire club career for the Warrington club.

Harrison spent a month on loan at the Widnes club during 2007.

Harrison played in Warrington's 25-16 victory over Huddersfield in the 2009 Challenge Cup Final at Wembley Stadium, London on Saturday 29 August 2009, in front of a crowd of 76,560, he played in the 30-6 victory over Leeds in the 2010 Challenge Cup Final at Wembley Stadium, London on Saturday 28 August 2010, in front of a crowd of 85,217, and he played in the 35-18 victory over the Leeds club in the 2012 Challenge Cup Final at Wembley Stadium, London on Saturday 25 August 2012, in front of a crowd of 79,180,

Harrison played in Warrington's 18-26 defeat by Leeds in the 2012 Super League Grand Final at Old Trafford, Manchester on Saturday 6 October 2012, in front of a crowd of 70,676, and he played in the 16-30 defeat by Wigan in the 2013 Super League Grand Final at Old Trafford, Manchester on Saturday 5 October 2013, in front of a crowd of 66,281.

Harrison played four matches on loan at the Wakefield Trinity Wildcats during 2016.

Barrow Raiders
On 11 September 2020 it was announced that Harrison had signed with Barrow for the 2021 season

And in 2022 Ben Carpenter tried to sign him up for Ellesmere Port Oilers. TBC

International
Ben Harrison represented Ireland in the 2008 Rugby League World Cup.

References

External links
 (archived by web.archive.org) Profile at warringtonwolves.com
 Ireland profile

1988 births
Living people
Barrow Raiders players
Doping cases in rugby league
England national rugby league team players
England Knights national rugby league team players
English people of Irish descent
English rugby league players
English rugby union players
Ireland national rugby league team players
Rugby league locks
Rugby league props
Rugby league second-rows
Rugby league players from Barrow-in-Furness
Rugby union players from Barrow-in-Furness
Wakefield Trinity players
Warrington Wolves players
Widnes Vikings players